Frédéric Thomas (born August 10, 1980) is a French footballer who plays as a midfielder for AS Mulsanne-Téloche. He began his career with Le Mans FC and returned there after a spell at AJ Auxerre. He finished his career at Grenoble Foot 38.

External links
Profile at mercato.365.com 

1980 births
Living people
People from Sarcelles
Association football midfielders
French footballers
Ligue 1 players
Ligue 2 players
AJ Auxerre players
Le Mans FC players
Grenoble Foot 38 players
Footballers from Val-d'Oise